The 2007 UST Growling Tigers men's basketball team represented University of Santo Tomas in the 70th season of the University Athletic Association of the Philippines. The men's basketball tournament for the school year 2007-08 began on July 7, 2007 and the host school for the season  was also UST.

The Tigers, the Season 69 champions, ended the double round-robin eliminations in joint fourth place with the FEU Tamaraws with eight wins and six losses. They then won over FEU in the playoff for the fourth and final semifinal slot. UST held the Tamaraws to a season-low of 6 points in the second quarter. They were eliminated by the Ateneo Blue Eagles in a knockout game of the first round of the stepladder Semifinals for the right to face the second-seeded De La Salle Green Archers in the second round.

UST suffered back-to-back losses at the start of the season but recovered by winning four of their next five games to finish the first round at third place with a 4–3 record.

Two of their games went into overtime and were both against La Salle who had rejoined the league after serving a one-year suspension in Season 69 for fielding ineligible players in the past three years.. The first was an 86–90 first round loss and the other was an 81–73 win. They have defeated the Green Archers for the first time since  the 1999 Finals where the Tigers lost in a three-game series with Game Three also going into overtime.

Jervy Cruz was named Most Valuable Player of the season. He topped the statistical points tally with 75.9 at the end of the  second round of eliminations on top of 11 double-doubles that included two playoff games. The last UST player to win the MVP was Chris Cantonjos in 1995. Cruz was third in the league in scoring with an average of 16.7 points per game behind the 21.3 average of Adamson's Patrick Cabahug and the 17.6 points per game of NU Bulldogs' Edwin Asoro. He led the league in rebounds with a 15.4 per game average.

Francis Allera was chosen Player of the Week by the UAAP Press Corps for the duration of July 19–22, while Khasim Mirza received the citation twice on the weeks of August 2–5 and 23–26.

Roster

Depth chart

Roster changes

Subtractions

Additions

Ineligibility issues 
Jojo Duncil, the Finals MVP of last year's championship series has announced to the team his decision to turn professional and forego his last playing year in the collegiate ranks.

It was revealed on July 2 during the press conference for the upcoming UAAP Season 70 by Institute of Physical Education and Athletics (IPEA) director Fr. Ermito de Sagon that Duncil's age eligibility was being questioned by other member schools after it was discovered that Duncil had two NSO certificates that showed varying data. One birth certificate had 1983 as Duncil's year of birth while another had shown that he was born in 1982.

According to Fr. de Sagon of the season's host school, the team decided to exclude him from the roster to avoid future games being put under protest which can only cause distraction to the rest of the team. De Sagon added that Duncil, being the rector's nephew is undoubtedly only 24 years old and is eligible to play this season.

Schedule and results

Preseason tournaments 

The Nike Summer League and the Filoil Flying V Preseason Invitational Cup games were aired on Studio 23.

UAAP games 

Elimination games were played in a double round-robin format and all of UST's games were televised on Studio 23.

Postseason tournament

UAAP statistics

Eliminations

Playoffs

Awards

References 

UST Growling Tigers basketball team seasons